The Order of Interbeing (anglicised Tiep Hien) is an international Buddhist community of monks, nuns and laypeople in the Plum Village Tradition founded between 1964 and 1966 by Vietnamese Buddhist monk Thích Nhất Hạnh.

Initially, Nhất Hạnh established the Order of Interbeing from a selection of six board members of the School for Youth and Social Services, three men and three women. The first members were ordained in February 1966 and vowed to study and practice the Fourteen Precepts of Engaged Buddhism. In 1981, Nguyen Anh Huong, a microbiologist and lay meditation teacher, became the seventh member of the Order. As of 2020, the Order of Interbeing had more than one thousand core members.

Tiếp Hiện (接現) is a Sino-Vietnamese term. The term did predate the Order of Interbeing's use in other contexts in Vietnamese, but was and remains uncommon. Tiếp means "being in touch with" and "continuing." Hiện means "realizing" and "making it here and now." The translation "Interbeing" is a word coined by  Nhất Hạnh to represent the Buddhist principles of anatta, pratītyasamutpāda, and the Madhyamaka understanding of śūnyatā. The order contains members of the "Fourfold Sangha" (male and female monastics and male and female laypersons) and is guided by the Fourteen Mindfulness Trainings.

Timeline 

1926
October 11 - Birth of Thich Nhat Hanh (birth name: Nguyễn Xuân Bảo) in Thừa Thiên, Vietnam)
1938
Birth of Chân Không (born Cao Ngoc Phuong in Bến Tre, Vietnam)
1942
Thầy Thich Nhat Hanh entered Từ Hiếu Temple as a śrāmaṇera
194_
Thầy Thich Nhat Hanh graduates from Báo Quốc Pagoda Buddhist Academy
1949
Thầy Thich Nhat Hanh is ordained a Buddhist monk
1950
Thầy Thich Nhat Hanh  co-founded An Quang Temple in Saigon, Vietnam
195_
Thầy Thich Nhat Hanh  Founded the Phuong Boi (Fragrant Palm Leaves) Meditation Center in the highlands of Vietnam
1956
Thầy Thich Nhat Hanh named Editor-in-Chief of “Vietnamese Buddhism” the periodical of the Unified Vietnam Buddhist Association
1958
Chân Không enrolled at the University of Saigon, studying biology
1960
Thầy Thich Nhat Hanh goes to the United States to study comparative religion at Columbia University and Princeton University
1961
Thầy Thich Nhat Hanh Teaches at Columbia University and Princeton University
1963
Thầy Thich Nhat Hanh returns to Vietnam
Sister Chân Không goes to Paris, France to complete her degree in biology
1964
Thầy Thich Nhat Hanh establishes Vạn Hạnh Zen Temple, La Boi Book Publisher and the School for Youth and Social Service (SYSS)
Chân Không returns to Vietnam to work with the SYSS
The Order of Interbeing is established
1965
Thầy Thich Nhat Hanh writes “In Search of the Enemy of Man” a letter to Martin Luther King Jr. urging him to publicly oppose the Vietnam War
1966
February 5 – the first members - the "Six Cedars" - are ordained into the Order of Interbeing. Among the six are Chân Không and Nhat Chi Mai. The latter would immolate herself in protest against the war a year later.
May 1 - TNH is given the Lamp Transmission at Từ Hiếu Temple from Master Chân Thật, making him a Dharmacharya (Dharma Teacher)
Thầy Thich Nhat Hanh returns to the US to lead a symposium at Cornell University
Thầy Thich Nhat Hanh speaks to many groups and leaders, including Robert McNamara and Martin Luther King, Jr. urging peace in Vietnam
Sister Chân Không is named operations director of the SYSS
Control of Van Hanh University is taken over by the Vice Chancellor who severs ties with the SYSS, calling Sister Chân Không a communist
The SYSS continues to work despite the harassment and murder of many of its members
1967
Thầy Thich Nhat Hanh is nominated for the Nobel Peace Prize by Martin Luther King Jr.
Thầy Thich Nhat Hanh is exiled from Vietnam by the Vietnamese government
Thầy Thich Nhat Hanh gains right of asylum in France
May – Nhat Chi Mai, one of the "Six Cedars", immolates herself for peace
1969
Thầy Thich Nhat Hanh Leads the Buddhist Peace Delegation
Sister Chân Không joins TNH in France to assist with the Buddhist Peace Delegation; she is considered an enemy of the Vietnamese government and exiled as well
Thầy Thich Nhat Hanh Establishes the Unified Buddhist Church in France
Thầy Thich Nhat Hanh lectures at the Sorbonne in Paris
1973
Paris Peace Accords are signed. Thầy Thich Nhat Hanh is not allowed re-entry into Vietnam by the newly formed communist government.
1975
Thầy Thich Nhat Hanh and Chân Không form the Sweet Potatoes Meditation Center in France
1976-77
Thầy Thich Nhat Hanh and Chân Không lead efforts to rescue Vietnamese boat people
1982
Plum Village Monastery in Dordogne, France is established by Thầy Thich Nhat Hanh and Chân Không
1987
Thầy Thich Nhat Hanh ordains the first North American members of the Order of Interbeing at Camp les Sommets Camp (Eastern Townships, Quebec, Canada)
1988
Chân Không is ordained by Thầy Thich Nhat Hanh as a nun on Vulture’s Peak in India
1990
Annabel Laity (True Virtue) ordained as a Dharmacharya and serves as Director of Practice at Plum Village
1992
The first conference of the International Order of Interbeing is held. This conference established the Order of Interbeing Charter, elected an Executive Council, and established that Assembly meetings would be held regularly to revise and amend the Charter. It also established a Council of Elders and a Council of Youth to draw from the experience of its members for leadership and guidance.
1997
Maple Forest Monastery was formed in Vermont
1998
Unified Buddhist Church is formed in the United States
Annabel Laity named to head the UBC, Inc
Green Mountain Dharma Center formed
Annabel Laity named Abbess of the Maple Forest Monastery and Green Mountain Dharma Center
2000
June - Thầy Thich Nhat Hanh assists in writing the Manifesto 2000 which consists of six pledges to promote a culture of peace and non-violence in the world. It has been signed by the Nobel Peace Prize Laureates 
Deer Park Monastery is formed in California near Escondido
2001
September 21 – Thầy Thich Nhat Hanh begins a fast for peace and to remember those who have died in the September 11 attacks
September 25 - Thầy Thich Nhat Hanh gives a speech at the Riverside Church in New York City urging the American people and government to think before reacting to the events of September 11 and to look for a peaceful resolution.
2003
September - Thầy Thich Nhat Hanh gives a talk at the Library of Congress.
2005
January 12 to April 11 - Thầy Thich Nhat Hanh returns to Vietnam to visit Buddhist temples, teach, and is allowed to publish a limited number of his books in Vietnamese; 100 monastic and 90 lay members of the OI accompany him
Two temples are re-established in Vietnam with TNH as their spiritual head: the Tu Hieu Temple and the Prajña Temple
August - Magnolia Grove Monastery is accepted by Thầy Thich Nhat Hanh as an Order of Interbeing center in Mississippi
October 9, Thầy Thich Nhat Hanh and Order of Interbeing members lead the “Peace is Every Step” walk at MacArthur Park in Los Angeles, California.
2006 
May 22 - Thầy Thich Nhat Hanh's book Old Path White Clouds is optioned for the film Buddha to be produced by MCorpGlobal. TNH makes an appearance at the Canne's film festival to promote the project 
September 11 - Thầy Thich Nhat Hanh makes an appearance in Los Angeles to promote the Buddha film project. The Dalai Lama endorsed the project at the luncheon which was attended by a number of Hollywood actors.
October 7 - Thầy Thich Nhat Hanh addresses UNESCO, calling for specific steps to reverse the cycle of violence, war, and global warming. He calls for a commitment of observing a weekly No Car Day to be promoted globally.
October 11 - Thầy Thich Nhat Hanh enjoys his 80th birthday
2007
February 20 to May 9 - Thầy Thich Nhat Hanh Returns to Vietnam to conduct "Grand Requiem For Praying" ceremonies to help heal the wounds of the Vietnam war.
May 20 to May 31 - Thầy Thich Nhat Hanh visits Thailand, giving Dharma talks and a 5-day retreat.
May - Blue Cliff Monastery established; Maple Forest Monastery and Green Mountain Dharma Center close and move to the new location as an extension of Plum Village Monastery 
2008
August - European Institute of Applied Buddhism is established Waldbröl, Germany, by members of the Plum Village Tradition and the Order of Interbeing.
2010
June - Asian Institute of Applied Buddhism is established in Hong Kong.
November - Thầy Thich Nhat Hanh gives a 3-day retreat in Hong Kong.
2013
May - Thầy Thich Nhat Hanh visits Hong Kong and gives a four-day retreat, culminating in a talk at the Hong Kong Colosseum. 
September - Thầy Thich Nhat Hanh gives a talk at Google HQ in California.
2014
March - The University of Hong Kong awards Thầy Thich Nhat Hanh an Honorary Doctorate in recognition of his contribution to world peace and humanity.
2015 
October - Thầy Thich Nhat Hanh is awarded the Pacem in Terris Peace and Freedom Award, a Catholic peace award.
2022 
January 22 - Repose of Thầy Thich Nhat Hanh at the age of 95 in his residence in Từ Hiếu Temple in Huế, Vietnam.

References

External links
Order of Interbeing website
I Am Home - Community of Mindful Living;  home of the "Mindfulness Bell" magazine with news, articles, and talks by Thich Nhat Hanh and other Order of Interbeing members.
Plum Village UK "The UK organisation which supports the practice of mindfulness taught by Zen Master Thich Nhat Hanh"

Buddhist orders
Plum Village Tradition